Nestor Ivanovich Novozhilov was a Soviet paleontologist. In 1948, Novozhilov described a pliosaur specimen discovered on the banks of Russia's Volga Riveras a new species, Pliosaurus rossicus. The specimen, while large, was damaged during the excavation and only the skull and chest region were successfully extracted in an excavation that began in 1938 .

Footnotes

References
 Ellis, Richard, (2003) Sea Dragons - Predators of the Prehistoric Oceans. University Press of Kansas. .

Soviet paleontologists